Jürg Tanner (born 7 August 1953) is a Swiss curler and former World Champion. He won a gold medal at the 1981 Air Canada Silver Broom, the men's world curling championship. He also won a silver and a bronze medal at the 1982 and 1980 Air Canada Silver Brooms, respectively, with teammates Jürg Hornisberger, Patrik Lörtscher, and Franz Tanner.

References

External links
 

Living people
Swiss male curlers
World curling champions
1953 births
European curling champions